Fitzroy River Barrage may refer to:

 Fitzroy River Barrage (Queensland)
 Fitzroy River Barrage (Western Australia)

See also 
 Fitzroy River (disambiguation)